Klinks Meyers (1890 – January 20, 1933) was a professional American football player.

Biography
Meyers was born in 1890 in La Crosse, Wisconsin. He died on January 20, 1933, in Hammond, Indiana, from injuries sustained in an auto accident.

Career
Meyers played for the Hammond Pros during the 1920 APFA season. He was a defensive back, wingback (running back) and blocking back (quarterback).

References

Sportspeople from La Crosse, Wisconsin
Players of American football from Wisconsin
Hammond Pros players
American football defensive backs
American football running backs
American football quarterbacks
1890 births
1933 deaths
Road incident deaths in Indiana